Zane Randall Stroope (born October 25, 1953) is an American composer and conductor. He has published more than 190 works, with: Oxford University Press, Carl Fischer, Alliance Music Publishing, Walton, Colla Voce, and Lorenz.

Biography
Stroope earned a master's degree in voice performance at the University of Colorado (Boulder) and his doctorate in conducting from Arizona State University. In an electronic publication, Stroope states that even though he had dabbled in composition since the age of ten, it was not until he wrote The Cloths of Heaven, and Inscription of Hope, that he began to gain recognition. He states, “I was quite fortunate to have written some works that found great attraction across the country. That sort of catapulted my career compositionally. I was soon being asked to write pieces and conduct those works with the groups that commissioned them. Through conducting, you learn about what works in composition. Both aspects of my career took hold, and I’ve never looked back. I’m busier today than I’ve ever been.”

In addition to composing music and  guest conducting, Stroope held Professor of Music positions at Oklahoma State University, Rowan University in Glassboro, New Jersey and at the University of Nebraska at Omaha. As a conductor, he regularly appears nationally and internationally in such venues as: Carnegie Hall, Chicago Orchestra Hall, Sopra Minerva (Rome), and the Kennedy Center.

Mentors and contemporaries 
Cecil Effinger and Normand Lockwood, mentors of Stroope, are well-respected American composers. Effinger's Little Symphony No. 1 and Four Pastorales, arguably his most recognizable pieces, are performed by many ensembles across the U.S. and abroad. Normand Lockwood won the prestigious Prix de Rome, a scholarship given the select students within the arts, which allowed him to study in Rome.

Both Effinger and Lockwood were students of Nadia Boulanger, a student of Gabriel Fauré. Fauré was one of the greatest French composers of the twentieth century. Nadia Boulanger, became one of the most influential music theory teachers of the twentieth century, one of her first pupils being American composer Aaron Copland. Stroope credits Boulanger for his mentors' support of his creativity saying, “Efficiency of writing would be the main thing I took from my studies with Effinger. Boulanger didn’t try to replicate herself through her students; she let them be successful in their own way. As a result, Lockwood and Effinger were very open to different styles of music in my writing. It wasn’t a cookie cutter approach to composition.”

Morten Lauridsen, a colleague and friend of Stroope, is the professor of composition at the University of Southern California Thornton School of Music and has been for more than thirty years. From 1994 to 2001 he held the position the composer-in-residence at the Los Angeles Master Chorale. Lauridsen, composer of works such as O magnum mysterium, Sure on this Shining Night, and Les Chansons des Roses, was named "American Choral Master" by the National Endowment for the Arts. In 2007, President Bush awarded him the National Medal of Arts in a White House ceremony. The National Medal of Arts is the highest award given to artists and arts patrons by the United States government. While Stroope taught at Rowan University in Glassboro, New Jersey, Lauridsen held a residency and The Rowan University Concert Choir performed Lauridsen's works. During the concert, Morten Lauridsen was awarded an Honorary Doctorate from Rowan University. Since then, Stroope and Lauridsen have continued to engage in collaborative projects. In 2010 and 2014, Lauridsen held residencies at Oklahoma State University similar to that at Rowan University.

Published material

Compositions (partial list of published works) 

 Abandon
All My Heart This Night Rejoices
 All So Still
 American Christmas/American Rhapsody
 Amor de mi alma
 An die Freude
 And Sure Stars Shining... (poem by Sara Teasdale)
 Caritas et amor
 Christi Mutter (No. 2 of Triptych)
 Cloths of Heaven
 Consecrate the Place and Day
 Dance for Love
 Danny Boy
 Danse Macabre
 Dies irae
 Dona nobis pacem
 Echo of Beauty
 Fanfare from Cantus natalis
 Four Sonnets of Garcilaso de la Vega
 Go Lovely Rose
 Homeland
 Hodie! This Day
 How Can I Keep From Singing?
 I carry your heart with me
 Inscription of Hope
 I Am Not Yours
I Have Loved Hours at Sea
 Image of Beauty
 Invocation
 Judaskuss (The Kiss of Judas) (No. 1 of Triptych)
 Tarantula (Jubilate Agno)
 Kyrie
 Lamentationes Jeremiae Prophetae
 Lux aeterna
 Magnificat
 Michelangelo's Sonnet
 My Flight to Heaven (Charm Me Asleep)
 Northwest Passage: Three Poetic Landscapes
 Odysseus and the Sirens
 Omnia Sol
 Os justi
Petrus No. 3 of Triptych
 Psalm 23
 Revelation
 Sanctus
 Shall I Compare Thee to a Summer's Day?
 She Walks in Beauty
 Sicut cervus
 Song to the Moon (La Luna)
 Soul Speak
 Sure On This Shining Night
 The Conversion of Saul
 The Pasture
The Love of Truth
 There is No Rose
The Road Not Taken
 This Endris Night
 Three Metaphysical Motets
 Vesuvius
 We Beheld Once Again the Stars
 Winter

Books
Stroope contributed to the book Composers on Composing for Choir along with composers such as René Clausen, Gwyneth Walker, John Rutter and Morten Lauridsen. In this book, Stroope speaks on his experiences with composing, strategies for composing and instructing young composers.

Awards and honors
2004 Brock Commission from the American Choral Directors Association.
Australian-American Fulbright
Douglas R. McEwen award for National Choral Excellence
Doug and Nickie Burns Endowed Chair in Choral Music 
Regents Distinguished Research Award 
 2018 Oklahoma State University Eminent Professor Award
 2020 Honorary member of ANDCI association of Italian choir directors.

References

External links (Citations)
Z. Randall Stroope's page at Carl Fischer
Official website
Oklahoma State University Department of Music
An interview with Northwest ACDA Women’s Choir Conductor Z. Randall Stroope

1953 births
Living people
20th-century classical composers
21st-century classical composers
American male classical composers
American classical composers
Oklahoma State University faculty
American male conductors (music)
University of Colorado Boulder alumni
University of Nebraska Omaha faculty
Arizona State University alumni
Musicians from Albuquerque, New Mexico
Rowan University faculty
21st-century American composers
20th-century American composers
20th-century American conductors (music)
21st-century American conductors (music)
20th-century American male musicians
21st-century American male musicians